Saint-Polycarpe is a municipality located in the Vaudreuil-Soulanges Regional County Municipality in the Montérégie region west of Montreal, Quebec, Canada, and just east of the Quebec-Ontario border. It was named for Polycarp, a 2nd-century bishop of Smyrna. The population as of the 2021 Canadian Census was 2,372.

While a parish during the 18th century, its territory included portions of what is now part of Saint-Zotique.

History
Settlement began around 1800 when a sawmill and a flour mill were built at the rapids of the Delisle river. In 1818, a chapel was built there and in 1830, the parish was established, called Saint-Polycarpe de la Nouvelle-Longueuil. Its post office was built in 1846.

In 1845, the Municipality of La Nouvelle-Longueuil was created, but abolished in 1847. In 1855, it was recreated out of Vaudreuil County as the Parish Municipality of Saint-Polycarpe. In 1887, the village itself split off from the surrounding rural parish to form the Village Municipality of Saint-Polycarpe.

On December 31, 1988, the parish and village merged again to form the Municipality of Saint-Polycarpe.

Demographics

Language

Local government
List of former mayors (since formation of current municipality):
 Joseph-Donat-Normand Ménard (1989–2012)
 Roland Daneau (2012–2013)
 Jean Yves Poirier (2013–present)

Infrastructure

Transportation
Saint-Polycarpe is located along Route 340 with nearby Quebec Autoroute 20 running south of the municipality.

Education
Commission Scolaire des Trois-Lacs operates Francophone schools.
 École secondaire Soulanges
 École du Val-des-Prés Sacré-Cœur

Lester B. Pearson School Board operates Anglophone schools.
 Soulanges Elementary School in Saint-Télesphore or Evergreen Elementary and Forest Hill Elementary (Junior Campus and Senior campus) in Saint-Lazare

Points of interest
 Natura Farm
 Saint-Polycarpe Municipal Library
 Schoune Brewery Farm
 Soulanges Sports Centre
 Soulanges Volunteer Action Centre

Climate
Based on the Dalhousie Mills station in Saint-Télesphore

See also
 List of municipalities in Quebec

References

External links

Location of Saint-Polycarpe (courtesy of Google Maps)
Vaudreuil-Soulanges County Map

Municipalities in Quebec
Incorporated places in Vaudreuil-Soulanges Regional County Municipality
Designated places in Quebec